Ñorquincó is a city in Ñorquincó Department, in southwest Río Negro Province, Argentina.
With a population of 444, it had a decline of 12.7% after the 509 in the previous census.

The name comes from the Mapudungun language, meaning Water Plant, due to a common plant of the area, called "ñorquin".

The town was founded on 16 November, 1901, as Department Seat of the department of the same name.

External links
 Provincial website
 NASA and Google images and info

Populated places in Río Negro Province